Dominika Cibulková was the defending champion but withdrew before the tournament began.

Barbora Strýcová won the title, defeating Magdaléna Rybáriková in the final, 6–4, 6–1.

Seeds

Draw

Finals

Top half

Bottom half

Qualifying

Seeds

Qualifiers

Lucky losers
  Naomi Broady

Draw

First qualifier

Second qualifier

Third qualifier

Fourth qualifier

References 
 Main draw
 Qualifying draw

Upper Austria Ladies Linz
Generali Ladies Linz Singles